Havant War Memorial Hospital was a health facility in Crossway in Havant, Hampshire, England. It was managed by Southern Health NHS Foundation Trust.

History
The foundation stone for the facility was laid by Major General John Seely, Lord Lieutenant of Hampshire, in January 1928. The building, which was designed by Vernon-Inkpen and Rogers, was opened in July 1929. A fine frieze of Wedgwood tiles depicting nursery rhymes was added to the children's ward in 1935. The hospital joined the National Health Service in 1948 and a casualty department was added in June 1957. After services transferred to modern facilities such as Fareham Community Hospital, Havant War Memorial Hospital closed in September 2011 and was subsequently converted for use as a care home.

Replacement
An 80 bed replacement hospital at the old Oak park school site was agreed and planning permission accepted by Havant Borough Council in 2010 but in the event was shelved, the site remaining empty, though a small Oak Park Clinic day services scheme did go ahead to provide day services.

Notes

References

Hospital buildings completed in 1929
1929 establishments in England
Hospitals established in 1929
Hospitals in Hampshire
Defunct hospitals in England
Havant